Katarína Bašternáková (born 12 October 1982) is a former Slovak tennis player. A native of Hurbanovo, she was runner-up at the 1999 Australian Open – Girls' singles tournament.

Bašternáková reached a record doubles ranking high of world number 441 during a playing career in which she won two ITF doubles titles. Although she never won an ITF singles title, her world singles ranking peaked at number 292 in May 2001.

Together with Stanislava Hrozenská, Bašternáková won a silver medal in tennis doubles at the 2003 and 2005 Summer Universiade games.

ITF finals (2–1)

Singles (0–1)

Doubles (2–0)

Grand Slam finals

Girls' singles

References

External links 
 
 

1982 births
Living people
People from Hurbanovo
Sportspeople from the Nitra Region
Slovak female tennis players
Universiade medalists in tennis
Universiade silver medalists for Slovakia
Medalists at the 2003 Summer Universiade
Medalists at the 2005 Summer Universiade
21st-century Slovak women